Rynok is a rural locality (a selo) and the administrative center of Rynkovsky Selsoviet, Limansky District, Astrakhan Oblast, Russia. The population was 193 as of 2010. There are eight streets.

Geography 
Rynok is located 45 km southeast of Liman (the district's administrative centre) by road. Burannoye is the nearest rural locality.

References 

Rural localities in Limansky District